Instant People was an Australian television series which aired from 1962 to 1963 on the Seven Network, hosted by Keith Smith. It was also known as The Nestle's Show.

Format
It was a Vox pop interview show. For example, one episode asked women on the street the question "should married women go to work?"; another interviewed a 16-year-old who left school to look after her ill mother and younger siblings following the death of her father; tested people's reactions to a bitter fruit cocktail; interviewed an art teacher, among other segments.

Episode status
22 of the episodes are held by the National Film and Sound Archive. It would appear the series was produced on film, which may explain the high survival rate, though this is not confirmed.

References

Australian non-fiction television series
1962 Australian television series debuts
1963 Australian television series endings
Black-and-white Australian television shows
English-language television shows
Seven Network original programming